Dolch Computer Systems Inc. (stylized as Dolch.) was a manufacturer of high-end ruggedized portable computers for industrial usage.

History 
The company was founded by Volker Dolch in 1987 in California. He sold his interest in the company in 1996 but continued to run it until he retired in 2001.

In February 2005, Dolch was acquired by Kontron AG from Siegel-Robert, Inc. Kontron had sold its rugged mobile platform to Azonix in 2007.

Products

Portable Add-in Computers (PAC) 

 Dolch FieldPAC FPAC5-233-XG
 Dolch PAC 486
 Dolch PAC 386

Pack Portable 
Dolch 286-Pack Portable Computer

References

External links 
 

Defunct companies based in California
Defunct computer companies of the United States
Portable computers